The 2002 Florida Gators baseball team represented the University of Florida in the sport of baseball during the 2002 college baseball season. The Gators competed in Division I of the National Collegiate Athletic Association (NCAA) and the Eastern Division of the Southeastern Conference (SEC). They played their home games at Alfred A. McKethan Stadium, on the university's Gainesville, Florida campus. The team was the first at Florida coached by Pat McMahon.

Roster

Schedule 

! style="background:#FF4A00;color:white;"| Regular season (40–15)
|- valign="top" 

|- align="center" bgcolor="ddffdd"
| February 2  ||||No. 21
| McKethan Stadium ||W 25–1
|Ramsey (1–0)
|Viars (0–1)
|None
|1,904
|1–0||–
|- align="center" bgcolor="ddffdd"
| February 3  ||Charleston Southern||No. 21
| McKethan Stadium ||W 12–2
|Hart (1–0)
|Holmen (0–1)
|None
|1,855
|2–0||–
|- align="center" bgcolor="ddffdd"
| February 6  ||||No. 21
| McKethan Stadium ||W 11–6
|Pete (1–0)
|Morrison (0–2)
|None
|1,133
|3–0||–
|- align="center" bgcolor="ddffdd"
| February 8  ||at No. 7 Rivalry||No. 21
|Mark Light StadiumCoral Gables, FL||W 12–9
|Drucker (1–0)
|Vazquez (0–1)
|None
|3,513
|4–0||–
|- align="center" bgcolor="ddffdd"
| February 10  ||at No. 7 Miami (FL)Rivalry||No. 21
|Mark Light Stadium||W 6–2
|Hart (2–0)
|Bengochea (0–2)
|Ramshaw (1)
|3,267
|5–0||–
|- align="center" bgcolor="ddffdd"
| February 13  ||||No. 14
| McKethan Stadium ||W 11–5
|Pete (2–0)
|Sills (1–1)
|None
|1,070
|6–0||–
|- align="center" bgcolor="ddffdd"
| February 16  ||||No. 14
| McKethan Stadium ||W 12–11
|Goldfarb (1–0)
|Cheek (0–1)
|None
|1,831
|7–0||–
|- align="center" bgcolor="ddffdd"
| February 17  ||Winthrop||No. 14
| McKethan Stadium ||W 8–4
|Hart (3–0)
|Reeves (1–1)
|Coleman (1)
|1,794
|8–0||–
|- align="center" bgcolor="ddffdd"
| February 20  ||||No. 11
| McKethan Stadium ||W 14–0
|Ramshaw (1–0)
|Castillo (4–2)
|None
|1,164
|9–0||–
|- align="center" bgcolor="ddffdd"
| February 24  ||||No. 11
| McKethan Stadium ||W 12–2
|Hart (4–0)
|Knoff (0–2)
|None
|1,605
|10–0||–
|- align="center" bgcolor="ddffdd"
| February 27  ||Siena||No. 6
| McKethan Stadium ||W 31–3
|Bartelt (1–0)
|Copskey (0–2)
|None
|780
|11–0||–
|-

|- align="center" bgcolor="ffdddd"
| March 1  ||No. 2 Rivalry||No. 6|| McKethan Stadium ||L 4–5||Lynch (1–0)||Goldfarb (0–1)||Roman (7)||4,246||11–1||–
|- align="center" bgcolor="ffdddd"
| March 3  ||at No. 2 Florida StateRivalry||No. 6||Dick Howser StadiumTallahassee, FL||L 4–9||Lynch (2–0)||Coleman (0–1)||None||4,150||11–2||–
|- align="center" bgcolor="ffdddd"
| March 7  ||||No. 6|| McKethan Stadium ||L 8–12||Callaway (1–0)||Bartelt (1–1)||None||889||11–3||–
|- align="center" bgcolor="ddffdd"
| March 8  ||Austin Peay||No. 6|| McKethan Stadium ||W 17–2||Hart (5–0)||Pew (1–1)||None||1,033||12–3||–
|- align="center" bgcolor="ddffdd"
| March 9  ||Austin Peay||No. 6|| McKethan Stadium ||W 13–4||Ramsey (2–0)||Mathews (1–1)||None||1,702||13–3||–
|- align="center" bgcolor="ddffdd"
| March 12  ||||No. 6|| McKethan Stadium ||W 20–3||Bartelt (2–1)||Wentzky (2–3)||None||1,075||14–3||–
|- align="center" bgcolor="ddffdd"
| March 13  ||College of Charleston||No. 6|| McKethan Stadium ||W 23–8||Potter (1–0)||McLeod (0–1)||None||1,144||15–3||–
|- align="center" bgcolor="ddffdd"
| March 15  ||No. 10 ||No. 6|| McKethan Stadium ||W 24–5||Ramshaw (2–0)||Montrenes (4–1)||None||2,011||16–3||1–0
|- align="center" bgcolor="ddffdd"
| March 16  ||No. 10 Ole Miss||No. 6|| McKethan Stadium ||W 7–6||Hart (6–0)||Pickens (3–1)||Coleman (2)||4,638||17–3||2–0
|- align="center" bgcolor="ddffdd"
| March 17  ||No. 10 Ole Miss||No. 6|| McKethan Stadium ||W 17–6||Ramsey (3–0)||Horne (0–1)||None||1,972||18–3||3–0
|- align="center" bgcolor="ddffdd"
| March 19  ||||No. 6|| McKethan Stadium ||W 15–3||Foster (1–0)||Ratliff (1–1)||None||703||19–3||–
|- align="center" bgcolor="ddffdd"
| March 20  ||||No. 6|| McKethan Stadium ||W 9–1||Pete (3–0)||Velosky (0–1)||None||1,343||20–3||–
|- align="center" bgcolor="ffdddd"
| March 22  ||at No. 4 South Carolina||No. 6||Sarge Frye FieldColumbia, SC||L 1–2||Bell (5–1)||Ramshaw (2–1)||Taylor (5)||2,242||20–4||3–1
|- align="center" bgcolor="ddffdd"
| March 23  ||at No. 4 South Carolina||No. 6||Sarge Frye Field||W 14–5||Hart (7–0)||Marchbanks (5–2)||None||4,123||21–4||4–1
|- align="center" bgcolor="ffdddd"
| March 24  ||at No. 4 South Carolina||No. 6||Sarge Frye Field||L 4–6||Bondurant (3–0)||Ramsey (3–1)||Taylor (6)||3,898||21–5||4–2
|- align="center" bgcolor="ddffdd"
| March 26  ||||No. 7|| McKethan Stadium ||W 17–1||Sadowski (1–0)||Kashner (1–1)||None||2,015||22–5||–
|- align="center" bgcolor="ffdddd"
| March 29  ||No. 23 ||No. 7|| McKethan Stadium ||L 3–8||Speigner (6–2)||Ramshaw (2–2)||Dueitt (3)||3,486||22–6||4–3
|- align="center" bgcolor="ddffdd"
| March 30  ||No. 23 Auburn||No. 7|| McKethan Stadium ||W 9–5||Hart (8–0)||Hughey (1–1)||None||2,833||23–6||5–3
|- align="center" bgcolor="ddffdd"
| March 31  ||No. 23 Auburn||No. 7|| McKethan Stadium ||W 6–1||Ramsey (4–1)||Paxton (6–2)||Coleman (3)||1,627||24–6||6–3
|-

|- align="center" bgcolor="ffdddd"
| April 3  ||at ||No. 7||Alexander Brest FieldJacksonville, FL||L 2–7||Regas (2–5)||Foster (1–1)||None||2,178||24–7||–
|- align="center" bgcolor="ffdddd"
| April 5  ||at No. 5 ||No. 7||Tuscaloosa, AL||L 1–4||Cormier (8–0)||Ramshaw (2–3)||None||5,285||24–8||6–4
|- align="center" bgcolor="ffdddd"
| April 6  ||at No. 5 Alabama||No. 7||||L 2–7||Norris (2–0)||Hart (8–1)||Reed (6)||5,478||24–9||6–5
|- align="center" bgcolor="ffdddd"
| April 7  ||at No. 5 Alabama||No. 7||||L 5–6||Tankersley (5–2)||Coleman (0–2)||None||5,201||24–10||6–6
|- align="center" bgcolor="ffdddd"
| April 9  ||||No. 12|| McKethan Stadium ||L 3–6||Blair (3–1)||Boss (0–1)||Lincoln (4)||1,955||24–11||–
|- align="center" bgcolor="ddffdd"
| April 12  ||at ||No. 12||Knoxville, TN||W 15–1||Ramshaw (3–3)||Riley (2–2)||None||1,607||25–11||7–6
|- align="center" bgcolor="ddffdd"
| April 13  ||at Tennessee||No. 12||||W 8–510||Coleman (1–2)||Terrell (2–6)||None||2,555||26–11||8–6
|- align="center" bgcolor="ffdddd"
| April 14  ||at Tennessee||No. 12||||L 5–6||Johnson (2–0)||Ramsey (4–2)||Terrell (4)||937||26–12||8–7
|- align="center" bgcolor="ddffdd"
| April 17  ||||No. 11|| McKethan Stadium ||W 5–4||Bartelt (3–1)||Johnson (1–4)||Coleman (4)||1,106||27–12||–
|- align="center" bgcolor="ddffdd"
| April 19  ||||No. 11|| McKethan Stadium ||W 13–7||Bartelt (4–1)||Sowers (3–5)||Goldfarb (1)||2,351||28–12||9–7
|- align="center" bgcolor="ddffdd"
| April 20  ||Vanderbilt||No. 11|| McKethan Stadium ||W 8–7||Hart (9–1)||Maultsby (0–3)||Boss (1)||1,912||29–12||10–7
|- align="center" bgcolor="ddffdd"
| April 21  ||Vanderbilt||No. 11|| McKethan Stadium ||W 7–3||Ramsey (5–2)||Little (4–5)||Goldfarb (2)||1,803||30–12||11–7
|- align="center" bgcolor="ddffdd"
| April 26  ||||No. 11|| McKethan Stadium ||W 12–6||Ramshaw (4–3)||Westphal (3–2)||Boss (2)||3,540||31–12||12–7
|- align="center" bgcolor="ddffdd"
| April 27  ||Georgia||No. 11|| McKethan Stadium ||W 12–9||Hart (10–1)||Sharpton (5–4)||Bartelt (1)||3,512||32–12||13–7
|- align="center" bgcolor="ffdddd"
| April 28  ||Georgia||No. 11|| McKethan Stadium ||L 4–6||Carswell (4–3)||Goldfarb (1–2)||None||2,517||32–13||13–8
|-

|- align="center" bgcolor="ddffdd"
| May 3 ||at ||No. 12||Dudy Noble FieldStarkville, MS||W 5–4||Bartelt (5–1)||Maholm (8–2)||Coleman (5)||6,562||33–13||14–8
|- align="center" bgcolor="ddffdd"
| May 4 ||at Mississippi State||No. 12||Dudy Noble Field||W 5–3||Hart (11–1)||Brock (6–4)||Goldfarb (3)||6,234||34–13||15–8
|- align="center" bgcolor="ddffdd"
| May 5 ||at Mississippi State||No. 12||Dudy Noble Field||W 4–0||Ramsey (6–2)||Collums (3–5)||None||3,074||35–13||16–8
|- align="center" bgcolor="ddffdd"
| May 7 ||||No. 10|| McKethan Stadium ||W 10–9||Goldfarb (2–2)||Livingston (1–2)||None||1,506||36–13||–
|- align="center" bgcolor="ffdddd"
| May 10 ||No. 25 ||No. 10|| McKethan Stadium ||L 4–510||Tompkins (5–0)||Goldfarb (2–3)||None||3,470||36–14||16–9
|- align="center" bgcolor="ddffdd"
| May 11 ||No. 25 LSU||No. 10|| McKethan Stadium ||W 6–3||Hart (12–1)||Wilson (7–4)||Goldfarb (4)||3,486||37–14||17–9
|- align="center" bgcolor="ffdddd"
| May 12 ||No. 25 LSU||No. 10|| McKethan Stadium ||L 5–8||Pettit (7–6)||Ramsey (6–3)||None||2,233||37–15||17–10
|- align="center" bgcolor="ddffdd"
| May 18 ||at ||No. 14||Cliff Hagan StadiumLexington, KY||W 14–4||Hart (13–1)||Hahn (3–8)||Bartelt (2)||473||38–15||18–10
|- align="center" bgcolor="ddffdd"
| May 18 ||at Kentucky||No. 14||Cliff Hagan Stadium||W 18–6||Ramsey (7–3)||Corrado (1–4)||None||378||39–15||19–10
|- align="center" bgcolor="ddffdd"
| May 19 ||at Kentucky||No. 14||Cliff Hagan Stadium||W 5–4||Coleman (2–2)||Blanton (5–7)||None||603||40–15||20–10
|-

|-
! style="background:#FF4A00;color:white;"| Post-season (6–4)
|-

|- align="center" bgcolor="ddffdd"
| May 22  ||vs. (6) Georgia||(3) No. 14||Metropolitan StadiumHoover, AL||W 7–2||Ramshaw (5–3)||Fellows (1–2)||None||–||41–15||1–0
|- align="center" bgcolor="ffdddd"
| May 23  ||vs. (2) No. 7 Alabama||(3) No. 14||Metropolitan Stadium||L 4–7||Cormier (10–3)||Hart (13–2)||Reed (9)||–||41–16||1–1
|- align="center" bgcolor="ddffdd"
| May 24  ||vs. (7) Mississippi State||(3) No. 14||Metropolitan Stadium||W 5–0||Ramsey (8–3)||Young (5–2)||None||–||42–16
|2–1
|- align="center" bgcolor="ddffdd"
| May 25  ||vs. (2) No. 7 Alabama||(3) No. 14||Metropolitan Stadium||W 7–4||Pete (4–0)||Sanders (8–3)||Coleman (6)||10,907||43–16
|3–1
|- align="center" bgcolor="ffdddd"
| May 25  ||vs. (2) No. 7 Alabama||(3) No. 14||Metropolitan Stadium||L 9–11||Reed (5–0)||Goldfarb (2–4)||Norris (1)||–||43–17||3–2
|-

|- align="center" bgcolor="ddffdd"
| May 31  ||(4) Bethune–Cookman||(1) No. 15|| McKethan Stadium ||W 13–1||Ramsey (9–3)||Montes (10–3)||None||2,246||44–17||1–0
|- align="center" bgcolor="ffdddd"
| June 1  ||(3) Miami (FL)Rivalry||(1) No. 15|| McKethan Stadium ||L 2–7||Bengochea (6–6)||Hart (13–3)||None||4,125||44–18||1–1
|- align="center" bgcolor="ddffdd"
| June 1  ||(4) Bethune–Cookman||(1) No. 15|| McKethan Stadium ||W 21–10||Ramshaw (6–3)||Dooley (9–6)||Falkenbach (1)||1,509||45–18||2–1
|- align="center" bgcolor="ddffdd"
| June 2  ||(3) Miami (FL)Rivalry||(1) No. 15|| McKethan Stadium ||W ||Ramsey (10–3)||Huguet (6–4)||None||2,594||46–18||3–1
|- align="center" bgcolor="ffdddd"
| June 2  ||(3) Miami (FL)Rivalry||(1) No. 15|| McKethan Stadium ||L 7–8||Huguet (7–4)||Ramshaw (6–4)||None||2,533||46–19||3–2
|-

Rankings from Collegiate Baseball. All times Eastern. Retrieved from FloridaGators.com

See also 
 Florida Gators
 List of Florida Gators baseball players

References

External links 
 Gator Baseball official website

Florida Gators baseball seasons
Florida Gators baseball team
Florida Gators
Florida